Elizabeth Parsons Ware Packard (28 December 1816 – 25 July 1897), also known as E.P.W. Packard, was an American advocate for the rights of women and people accused of insanity. She was wrongfully confined by her husband who claimed that she had been insane for more than three years. At her trial, however, a jury took just seven minutes to find her not insane. She later founded the Anti-Insane Asylum Society, campaigning for divorced women to retain custody of their children.

Life

Elizabeth Packard, born in Ware, Massachusetts, was the oldest of three children and the only daughter of Samuel and Lucy Ware. Samuel was a Congregational minister in the Connecticut Valley of the Ware Congregational Church from 1810 to 1826. She was able to get a quality education at the Amherst Female Seminary, where she studied French, algebra, and the new classics, thanks to the "adequate wealth" of her parents, leading her to become a well-educated and middle-class woman. Still, in 1835, at age 19, she was diagnosed with "brain fever," an outdated term for which there is no modern equivalent. When the Ware's family physician failed to help Elizabeth, her father decided on hospitalization. The closest hospital was Worcester State Hospital, with Dr. Samuel Woodard at the helm; he was highly regarded for patient care. Thus, Elizabeth's father brought her to the hospital, and wrote on the admission papers that she suffered from "mental labor" from her occupation as teacher. The length of her stay, more than anything else, shows she was physically ill (not mentally ill); just six weeks.

At the insistence of her parents, Elizabeth Parsons Ware married Calvinist minister Theophilus Packard, fourteen years her senior and said to be "cold and domineering", on 21 May 1839. The couple had six children: Theophilus (b. 1842), Ira Ware (b. 1844), Samuel Ware (b. 1847), Elizabeth Ware (b. 1850), George Hastings (b. 1853), and Arthur Dwight (b. 1858). They lived in Western Massachusetts until September 1854. Beginning in 1857, after having lived in Ohio and Iowa for short periods, the family moved to Manteno, Kankakee County, Illinois, and appeared to have a peaceful and uneventful marriage.

Theophilus, however, held quite decisive religious beliefs. After many years of marriage, Elizabeth Packard outwardly questioned her husband's beliefs and began expressing opinions that were contrary to his. While the main subject of their dispute was religion, the couple also disagreed on child rearing, family finances, and the issue of slavery, with Elizabeth defending John Brown, which embarrassed Theophilus.

When Illinois opened its first hospital for the mentally ill in 1851, the state legislature passed a law that within two years of its passage was amended to require a public hearing before a person could be committed against his or her will. There was one exception, however: a husband could have his wife committed without either a public hearing or her consent. In 1860, Theophilus Packard judged that his wife was "slightly insane", a condition he attributed to "excessive application of body and mind". He arranged for a doctor, J.W. Brown, to speak with her. The doctor pretended to be a sewing machine salesman. During their conversation, Elizabeth complained of her husband's domination and his accusations to others that she was insane. Brown reported this conversation to Theophilus (along with the observation that Mrs. Packard "exhibited a great dislike to me"). Theophilus decided to have Elizabeth committed. She learned of this decision on June 18, 1860, when the county sheriff arrived at the Packard home to take her into custody.

Elizabeth Packard spent the next three years at the Jacksonville Insane Asylum in Jacksonville, Illinois  (now the Jacksonville Developmental Center). She was regularly questioned by her doctors but refused to agree that she was insane or to change her religious views. In June 1863, due, in part, to pressure from her children, who wished her released, the doctors declared that she was incurable and discharged her. Upon her discharge, Theophilus locked her in the nursery of their home and nailed the windows shut. Elizabeth managed to drop a letter complaining of this treatment out of the window, which was delivered to her friend Sarah Haslett. Sarah Haslett in turn delivered the letter to Judge Charles Starr, who issued a writ of habeas corpus ordering Theophilus to bring Elizabeth to his chambers to discuss the matter. After being presented with Theophilus' evidence, Judge Starr scheduled a jury trial to allow a legal determination of Elizabeth's sanity to take place.

Packard v. Packard
At the subsequent trial of Packard v. Packard, which lasted five days, Theophilus's lawyers produced witnesses from his family who testified that Elizabeth had argued with her husband and tried to withdraw from his congregation. These witnesses concurred with Theophilus that this was a sign of insanity. The record from the Illinois State Hospital stating that Mrs. Packard's condition was incurable was also entered into the court record.

Elizabeth's lawyers, Stephen Moore and John W. Orr, responded by calling witnesses from the neighborhood that knew the Packards but were not members of Theophilus' church. These witnesses testified they never saw Elizabeth exhibit any signs of insanity, while discussing religion or otherwise. The final witness was Dr. Duncanson, who was both a physician and a theologian. Dr. Duncanson had interviewed Elizabeth and he testified that while not necessarily in agreement with all her religious beliefs, she was sane in his view, arguing that "I do not call people insane because they differ with me. I pronounce her a sane woman and wish we had a nation of such women."

The jury took only seven minutes to find in Elizabeth's favor. She was legally declared sane, and Judge Charles Starr, who had changed the trial from one about habeas corpus to one about sanity, issued an order that she should not be confined. As scholar Kathryn Burns-Howard described it: "We will never know Elizabeth's true mental state or the details of her family life."

Life after the trial
When Elizabeth Packard returned to the home she shared with her husband in Manteno, Illinois, she found that the night before her release, her husband had rented their home to another family, sold her furniture, had taken her money, notes, wardrobe and children, and had left the state. She appealed to  the Supreme Courts of both Illinois and Massachusetts, to where her husband had taken her children, but had no legal recourse, as married women in these states at the time had no legal rights to their property or children (see Coverture). As such, the Anti-Insane Asylum Society was formed.

With that, she did not go back to her former life, but became a national celebrity of sorts, publishing "an armload of books and criss-crossing the United States on a decades-long reform campaign", not only fighting for married women's rights and freedom of speech, but calling out against "the power of insane asylums". She became what some scholars call "a publicist and lobbyist for better insanity laws". As scholar Kathryn Burns-Howard has argued, Packard reinvented herself in this role, earning enough to support her children and even her estranged husband, from whom she remained separated for the rest of her life. Ultimately, moderate supporters of women's rights in the northern U.S. embraced her, weaving her story into arguments about slavery, framing her experience as a type of enslavement and even arguing in the midst of the Civil War that a county in the midst of freeing African-American slaves should do the same for others who suffered from abusive husbands. Some argue that she seemed oblivious to her racial prejudice in arguing that white women had a "moral and spiritual nature" and suffered more "spiritual agony" than formerly enslaved African-Americans. Even so, others say that her story provided "a stirring example of oppressed womanhood" that others did not.

Elizabeth petitioned the Illinois and Massachusetts legislatures, and in 1869 legislation was passed in those states allowing married women equal rights to property and custody of their children. Upon this being passed, her husband voluntarily ceded custody of their children back to Elizabeth, and her children came to live with her in Chicago.

Elizabeth realized how narrow her legal victory had been; while she had escaped confinement, it was largely a measure of luck.  The underlying social principles which had led to her confinement still existed. She founded the Anti-Insane Asylum Society and published several books, including Marital Power Exemplified, or Three Years Imprisonment for Religious Belief (1864), Great Disclosure of Spiritual Wickedness in High Places (1865), The Mystic Key or the Asylum Secret Unlocked (1866), and The Prisoners' Hidden Life, Or Insane Asylums Unveiled (1868). In 1867, the State of Illinois passed a "Bill for the Protection of Personal Liberty" which guaranteed that all people accused of insanity, including wives, had the right to a public hearing. She also saw similar laws passed in three other states. Even so, she was strongly attacked by medical professionals and anonymous citizens, unlike others such as Dorothea Dix, with her former doctor from the Jacksonville Insane Asylum, Dr. McFarland, who privately called her "a sort of Joan D'Arc in the matter of stirring up the personal prejudices". As such, Elizabeth's work on this front was "broadly unappreciated" while she was alive. She only received broader recognition, starting in the 1930s, by a well-known historian of mental illness, Albert Deutsch, and again in the 1960s from those who were "attacking the medical model of insanity".

She died on July 25, 1897. In her obituary, The Inter Ocean, a Chicago newspaper, described her as "the reformer of insane asylum methods".

Literary references
Barbara Sapinsley was the first to write anything at length on E.P.W. Packard. Her 1991 book, informed by Packard's family in the late 1960s/early 1970s, took 20 years to find a publisher. The Private War of Mrs. Packard is a true biography of this important woman.

Linda V. Carlisle and University of Illinois Press brought out Elizabeth Packard: A Noble Fight in 2010. Includes individual legislation that Packard campaigned for and/or helped bring about.

Barbara Hambly refers to Elizabeth Packard in some detail in her 2005 novel on the insanity of Mary Todd Lincoln (The Emancipator's Wife: A Novel of Mary Todd Lincoln.)

Emily Mann wrote the play Mrs. Packard, which premiered in May 2007. In Mann's play, Packard describes her life fully in the insane asylum; it is considered historically accurate.

Kate Moore tells the story of Elizabeth Packard in "The Woman They Could Not Silence: One Woman, Her Incredible Fight for Freedom, and the Men Who Tried to Make Her Disappear".

See also
The Yellow Wallpaper

References

Further reading

Cooley, Thomas (2001). The Ivory Leg in the Ebony Cabinet: Madness, Race, and Gender in Victorian America, University of Massachusetts Press, .
Holmes, Melanie (2020), Manteno: Images of America, Arcadia Publishing, ISBN 9781467104487

Moore, Kate (2021), The Woman They Could Not Silence: One Woman, Her Incredible Fight for Freedom, and the Men Who Tried to Make Her Disappear, Sourcebooks, 
Norgen, Jill (2013), Rebels at the Bar: The Fascinating, Forgotten Stories of America's First Women Lawyers, New York University Press, .
Packard, Elizabeth, The Prisoners' Hidden Life Or Insane Asylums Unveiled (1868) Kessinger Publishing, LLC (February 21, 2008) .
Packard, Elizabeth, Marital Power Exemplified in Mrs. Packard's Trial Fred B Rothman & Co (October 1994) .
Sigurðardóttir, Elísabet Rakel (2013). Women and Madness in the 19th Century: The effects of oppression on women's mental health, University of Ireland. 
.
Wood, Mary Elene (1994), The Writing on the Wall: Women's Autobiography and the Asylum, University of Illinois Press, .

External links
 
 

1816 births
1897 deaths
American women's rights activists
19th-century American memoirists
American women non-fiction writers
People from Kankakee County, Illinois
American health activists
Mental health activists
Activists from Illinois
American women memoirists
19th-century American women writers
Writers from Illinois